The 2004 ICC Americas Championship was a cricket tournament in Bermuda, taking place between 6 and 16 July 2004. It gave six North and South American Associate and Affiliate members of the International Cricket Council experience of international one-day cricket.

Teams

There were 6 teams that played in the tournament. These teams were non-test member nations of the Americas Cricket Association. The teams that played were:

Squads

Group stage

Points Table

Group stage

Statistics

International cricket competitions in 2004
ICC Americas Championship
2004 in Caribbean sport
International cricket competitions in Bermuda